This article presents a list of the historical events and publications of Australian literature during 2018.

Major publications

Literary fiction
 Michael Mohammed Ahmad, The Lebs
 Robbie Arnott, Flames
 Trent Dalton, Boy Swallows Universe (novel)
 Gregory Day, A Sand Archive
 Ceridwen Dovey, In the Garden of the Fugitives
 Rodney Hall, A Stolen Season
 Gail Jones, The Death of Noah Glass
 Eleanor Limprecht, The Passengers
 Melissa Lucashenko, Too Much Lip
 Jennifer Mills, Dyschronia
 Heather Morris, The Tattooist of Auschwitz
 Kate Morton, The Clockmaker's Daughter
 Kristina Olsson, Shell
 Ryan O'Neill, 99 Interpretations of The Drover's Wife
 Heather Rose, The Museum of Modern Love
 Kim Scott, Taboo
 Tim Winton, The Shepherd's Hut
 Markus Zusak, Bridge of Clay

Children's and Young Adult fiction
 Maxine Beneba Clarke, Wide Big World, illustrated by Isobel Knowles
 Mem Fox, Bonnie and Ben Rhyme Again, illustrated by Judy Horacek
 Andy Griffiths, The 104-Storey Treehouse
 Ambelin Kwaymullina and Ezekial Kwaymullina, Catching Teller Crow
 Richard Roxburgh, Artie and the Grime Wave
 Shaun Tan, Cicada
 Shaun Tan, Tales from the Inner City
 Lili Wilkinson, After the Lights Go Out

Crime
 Candice Fox, Redemption Point
 Kerry Greenwood, The Spotted Dog
Chris Hammer, Scrublands
 Jane Harper, The Dry
 Chloe Hooper, The Arsonist: A Mind on Fire
 Michael Robotham, The Other Wife

Science Fiction and Fantasy
 Alan Baxter
Hidden City
Devouring Dark
 Kylie Chan, Scales of Empire
 Traci Harding, This Present Past
 Kaaron Warren, Tide of Stone

Poetry
 Jordie Albiston, Warlines
 Judith Beveridge, Sun Music: New and Selected Poems
 Ken Bolton, Starting at Basheer's
 Sarah Day, Towards Light & Other Poems
 Paul Hetherington, Moonlight on Oleander
 Bella Li, Lost Lake
 John Mateer, João
 Tim Metcalf, The Underwritten Plain
 Tracy Ryan, The Water Bearer

Drama
Alana Valentine, The Sugar House

Biographies and memoirs
 Peter FitzSimons, Monash's Masterpiece 
 Jacqui Lambie, Rebel with a Cause: You can't keep a bloody Lambie down — my story from soldier to senator and beyond
 Bri Lee, Eggshell Skull
 Anne Summers, Unfettered and Alive: A Memoir
 Gillian Triggs, Speaking Up
 Nadia Wheatley, Her Mother's Daughter

Non-fiction
 Cynthia Banham, A Certain Light
 Steve Biddulph, Raising Boys In The Twenty-First Century: How To Help Our Boys Become Open-Hearted, Kind And Strong Men
 Behrouz Boochani, No Friend But the Mountains
 Stephen Gapps, The Sydney Wars: Conflict in the Early Colony 1788–1817
 Richard Glover, The Land Before Avocado
 Billy Griffiths, Deep Time Dreaming
 Anita Heiss (editor), Growing Up Aboriginal in Australia
Thomas Keneally, Australians: A Short History
 Meredith Lake, The Bible in Australia: A cultural history
 Michael C Madden, The Victoria Cross: Australia Remembers
 Leigh Sales, Any Ordinary Day

Awards and honours

Note: these awards were presented in the year in question.

Lifetime achievement

Fiction

National

Children and Young Adult

National

Crime and Mystery

National

Science Fiction

Non-Fiction

Poetry

Drama

Deaths
6 March – Peter Nicholls, 78, writer and editor of The Encyclopedia of Science Fiction (born 1939)
8 March – Peter Temple, 71, author of Jack Irish series (born 1946)
14 April – Frank Bren, 74, Australian actor and playwright (born 1943)
16 April – Beverley Farmer, 77, novelist and short story writer (born 1941)
1 June – Jill Ker Conway, 83, academic and memoir writer, author of The Road from Coorain (born 1934)
2 June – Tony Morphett, 80, screenwriter and novelist
30 August – Peter Corris, 76, crime novelist (born 1942)
31 August – Ian Jones, 86, author and television writer and director (born 1931)
12 September – Albert Ullin , 88, German Australian children's bookseller and founder of Australia's first children's bookstore, The Little Bookroom (born 1930)
16 September – John Molony, 91,  historian and Emeritus Professor of History at Australian National University (born 1927)
6 October – James Cowan, 76, author (born 1942)
21 October – Eleanor Witcombe, 95, screenwriter and playwright (born 1923)
22 October 
Anne Fairbairn, 90, poet, journalist and expert in Arab culture (born 1928)
Rose Zwi, 90, novelist (born 1928)
22 November – Judith Rodriguez, 82, poet and academic (born 1936)

See also
 Literature
 List of years in Australian literature
 List of Australian literary awards

References

Literature
Australian literature by year
Years of the 21st century in Australia 
Years of the 21st century in literature